This is a list of Polish desserts. Polish cuisine has evolved over the centuries to become very eclectic due to Poland's history. Polish cuisine shares many similarities with other Central European cuisines, especially German, Austrian and Hungarian cuisines, as well as Jewish, Belarusian, Ukrainian, Russian, French and Italian culinary traditions.

Polish desserts

See also

 List of Polish dishes
 Polish cuisine – desserts and sweets
 List of desserts

External links
 Polish iconic sweets

References

 
Polish